Community Newspapers Inc. (CNI) is a subsidiary of Gannett. Based in New Berlin, Wisconsin, it publishes eight weekly newspapers in the Milwaukee metropolitan area. CNI has about 110 full-time employees and about 30 part-time employees.

History 
Publisher Duane Dunham began the Oak Creek Pictorial in 1956. By 1964 he had added the Greenfield Observer, Greendale Village Life, and the Hub in Hales Corners to his growing publishing empire. Three years later Community Newspapers, Inc bought the competing Tri-Town News which served Hales Corners, Muskego and Franklin. CNI expanded into the North Shore suburbs in 1974 when it bought the five Herald weekly newspapers from North Shore Publishing.  These papers were the Glendale, Brown Deer, Shorewood, Whitefish Bay, and Fox Point/Bayside/River Hills Heralds. The largest addition was the 1979 purchase of 11 newspapers published by Shinner Publications including the Hartford, Menomonee Falls, Germantown, Elm Grove, Brookfield, New Berlin, and Wauwatosa papers. Finally, in 1983, the West Allis Star was added to the roster of suburban papers. By 1986, when Duane Dunham retired, CNI had a total of 23 community newspapers. Upon his retirement, the chain was sold to Sun Media corp of Cleveland, Ohio. It remained a major competitor of print journalism in the Milwaukee Metropolitan market until it was purchased by Journal Communications in 1997. By 2006, the suburban editions were consolidated into only 11 editions, losing the original newspaper names.

The list of the 23 weekly newspapers at their 1986 peak was as follows:

 The Bay Viewer
 Brookfield News
 Brown Deer Herald
 Cudahy Reminder-Enterprise
 Elm Grove Elm Leaves
 Fox Point, Bayside, River Hills Herald
 Franklin-Hales Corners Hub
 Germantown Banner-Press
 Glendale Herald
 Greendale Village Life
 Greenfield Observer
 Muskego Sun
 Mequon-Thiensville Courant
 Menomonee Falls News
 New Berlin Citizen
 Oak Creek Pictorial
 St Francis Reminder-Enterprise
 Shorewood Herald
 South Milwaukee Voice Graphic
 Sussex-Lannon-Lisbon News
 Wauwatosa News-Times
 West Allis Star
 Whitefish Bay Herald

Most of the CNI newspapers had long histories and have traded owners several times in their history.  The Wauwatosa News-Times (now Wauwatosa NOW) dates back to March 1899, the West Allis Star (now Greenfield-West Allis NOW) was first published on December 14, 1916, and the Whitefish Bay Herald (now North Shore NOW) first issue was released on June 12, 1930.

Newspapers
 Brookfield-Elm Grove NOW
 Germantown-Menomonee Falls NOW
 Greenfield-West Allis NOW
 Muskego-New Berlin NOW
 North Shore NOW (weekly newspaper renamed from the North Shore Herald in 2007)
 Oak Creek-Franklin-Greendale-Hales Corners NOW
 South Shore NOW
 Wauwatosa NOW
 Whitefish Bay NOW

References

External links
www.cninewsonline.com

Newspaper companies of the United States
Publishing companies established in 1979
Gannett publications